Veronika Drahotová (born July 25, 1975) is a Czech artist and curator best known for mixed-media work incorporating painting, photography, video and installation.

In 1992, she was one of the youngest students ever to matriculate at the prestigious Academy of Fine Arts, Prague (AVU), studying under J. David and J. Sopko, receiving a one-year scholarship (1995) at the San Francisco Art Institute, and a Master of Arts degree in 2000.

She made her first big splash in the art world in 1998 with Castle in the Sky, a large-scale light installation funded by the  Soros Foundation. In it, the famous Prague Castle was completely illuminated in a rainbow glow for several nights, and it’s still considered one of the largest public art displays to take place in the Czech Republic.

The rainbow symbolism from "Castle in the Sky" was naturally incorporated into Drahotova’s ever-growing iconographic vocabulary. This highly visualized language of symbols appears persistently throughout her work across all mediums, encouraging a sense of interconnectedness within and between each. The evolution of that iconography can clearly be seen in her early portrait work, which includes the postmodern series “Bad Boys” (1997-2004), and plays out prominently in her constructed objects and installations, such as FF (for S. H.; 2004) and POP (Preliminary Orientation in the Problem; 1999).

Her work was most recently featured in Vienna for Art’s Sake (Feb. 2015), a group show with contributions from more than 100 visual artists, including Christo, Frank Gheary and Zaha Hadid, which will tour Europe and the U.S. as the “Luciano Benetton Collection 10 x 12.”

Her most recent series’ have focused more on painting, specifically large-scale canvases filled with geometric objects that merge with and collide into 3-D relief elements, an implicit commentary on the tension between philosophy and psychology, spiritualism and mathematics. Furthermore, Drahotova has created a new system of painting she refers to as ‘architectonic.’ This approach utilizes two or more canvases in a single painting, allowing the pieces to be arranged in several predetermined ways to reveal different compositions. By orientating or interchanging the canvases both horizontally and vertically, and rotating them 90 degrees in relation to each other, several compositions emerge. In this way, the canvases of the recent series “Massive Memory” (2015) can be arranged together on the wall in various interchangeable configurations, like interactive panels in a constantly shifting landscape.

In 2002 Drahotova founded Home Gallery in Prague, and as director curated more than a dozen exhibitions over two years featuring artists from all over Europe.

She has had more than ten solo shows in the U.S., Japan, and across Europe, and participated in dozens of group shows. She currently resides in Prague.

Solo shows
2015: Massive Memory, Kampa Gallery, Sovovy mlýny, Prague, CZ
2014: Ale/But, Černá labuť, Praha, CZ
2014: Until the End of Time, Piersone, Praha, CZ
2013: Theory of Nothing, Berlínskej model, Prague, CZ
2012: 12, Gambit Gallery, Prague, CZ
2012: Sugar Choice  Prince Prager Gallery, Prague
2012: Retrospective, Uffo Společenské Centrum Trutnov 
2011:  They_I (with Nikola Semotanova), Trafacka Gallery, Prague, CZ
2009:  Memplex City, Icon Gallery, Prague, CZ
2008:  Memplex Rip, Blansko Gallery, CZ
2005: Autoreverse, The Art Critics Gallery, Prague, CZ
2004: Preliminary Orientation, Chromosome Gallery, Berlin, D
2004: Ali-En-Ace, Futura gallery, Prague, CZ
2002: Latest Art, Vernon Fine Art, Prague, CZ
2001: GRAVE, Remont Gallery, Belgrade, YU
2001: Mind the Heart, Behemot Gallery, Prague, CZ
2001: Sky is Empty, U cerného pavouka Gallery, Ostrava, CZ
1999: Friends Forever, Pecka Gallery, Prague, CZ
1998: See Through, the Czech Center, Brussels, Belgium
1996: Fiona Whitney Gallery, Wilcox L.A., USA

Selected group shows
2015: Vienna for Art's Sake!, Winter Palas, Vienna, AT
2014: Peace Plese, Artinbox Gallery, Praha, CZ
2014: Damský Gambit, Brusel
2013: 12, Galerie Gambit, Praha, CZ
2012: The Fine Art Collection, Barbican Center, UK
2012: Současná česká malba, NTK, CZ
2012: Fire Walk With Me, XXL, Louny, CZ
2011: Pátý přes deváty, Trafačka, CZ
2011: Unknown Area, Gallery Graz, D
2009: Girls Against Boys, Galerie Szara, PL
2008: Sexismus, galerie Vaclava Spaly, Praha, CZ
2008: Spleen & Ideal, Karlín studios, Praha, CZ
2007: Vitamin P, Galerie Bastart, Bratislava, Košice, SK
2007: Spleen & Ideal, Brno Gallery, CZ
2006: Safe, Karlin Studios, Pague, CZ
2006: Runaway, Space Gallery, Bratislava, SK
2006: Sigmund Freud – Life is but a Dream, Oldtown Gallery, Prague, CZ
2006: Czech Point, NOG
2006: Videobus, Prague – Brno, CZ
2006: Mnultiplace, Bratislava, SK
2006: Stop domestic violence, Praha, CZ
2005: Beauty Free Shop, Praha, CZ
2005: Lebka, AVU Gallery, Praha, CZ
2005: Multiplace, Bratislava, SK
2004: Pure Beauty, Critics Gallery, Prague, CZ
2004: Eastern Alience, TOE, Berlin, D
2004: Within Reach, Home Gallery, CZ
2003: TAIL, Twig Gallery, NYC, USA
2003: Pretty Communication, Priestor Gallery, Bratislava, SK
2003: Inout, Budapest, Hungary
2003: Inout, Prague, CZ
2003: Elektrobot, Prague, CZ
2002: In Between, Czech Center, NYC, USA
2002: City of Women, Cankarjev dom, Ljubljana, Si
2002: Art Frankfurt, Chromosome Gallery, D
2001: Fotok, Meo, Budepest, H
2001: To Flow To, Chromosome Gallery, Berlin, D
2001: Artists for Umelec, Hardheaded Gallery, Prague, CZ
2001: Feme Fatal, Kutná Hora, CZ
2000: Bohemian Birds, Kunst Haus, Draezden, D,
2000: Story, noD, Prague
2000: Training, Bratislava – Kosice, SK
2000: Sources of New Style, Prague, CZ
2000: The Southern Affair, Ceske Budejovice, CZ
2000: Artesco, Polyphonic arts in Prague, CZ
2000: Open Air, Exodus, Prague, CZ
2000: ... (three dots), the NO D Gallery, Prague, CZ
1999: No Sex Until Marriage, Prague, CZ
1999: Open Gallery, Prague, CZ
1998: Zelená (Green), the Academy of Fine Arts (AVU) gallery, Prague, CZ
1998: Umělecké dílo ve veřejném prostoru (Art in Public Space), implementation of projects (see below), Prague, CZ
1997: Umělecké dílo ve veřejném prostoru (Art in Public Space), exhibition concepts in the Veletrzni Palace (Modern and Contemporary Art Collection of the Czech National Gallery), Prague, CZ
1995: In and Out, San Francisco, USA
1994: Obrazy (Paintings), Prsten Gallery, Prague, CZ

Work
2002 – 2004: Director of Home Gallery, Prague, CZ

Education
1997-2000: MFA Visual Communications Studio, lecturer J. David, (AVU), Prague, CZ achieved Master of Fine Art degree
1996: Passed the BA exams at AVU, Prague, CZ
1995: One-semester scholarship at the San Francisco Art Institute, USA
1993-96: Classical Painting Techniques Studio, Professor Beran (AVU), Prague, CZ
1992-93: Painting I Studio, Professor J. Sopko (AVU), Prague, CZ
1991-92: Vaclav Hollar High School of Applied Arts, Prague, CZ
1990-91: High School of Applied Arts and Technology, Prague, CZ
AVU = Academy of Fine Arts

References

External links 
 veronikadrahotova.com
Interview on Czech radio

Czech artists
Living people
1975 births